Crookston School District 593 (Independent School District #593) or Crookston Public Schools (CPS) is a school district headquartered in Crookston, Minnesota.

Schools
 Zoned schools
 Crookston High School - Grades 7-12
 Highland Elementary School - Grades 1-6
 Washington Elementary School - Preschool and kindergarten
 Others
 New Paths Alternative Learning Center (ALC) - grades 9-12
 Northern Lights Academy

References

External links
 
School districts in Minnesota
Crookston, Minnesota
Education in Polk County, Minnesota